The Çukurova Football League, also known as the Adana Football League, was founded as a regional football league for Adana and Mersin based clubs in 1924. The name of the league comes from Çukurova region. In some years clubs from Maraş and Malatya also participated in the league. In Adana, the football game was played during the 1910s. Adana Türk Gücü were the first club in Adana founded in 1913. The league was played within a year until 1936. 

In the period from 1924 to 1935, the winners of the Çukurova League qualified for the former Turkish Football Championship. Later from 1940 to 1951, they qualified for the qualifying stages of the national championship. In 1955 professionalism was introduced in the league, hence the name officially became Adana Profesyonel Ligi (Adana Professional League). After the introduction of the professional nationwide league in 1959, known as Süper Lig today, the league lost its first level status. Adana Demirspor are the most successful club in the history of the league, having won a record 15 championship titles.

Participated teams
The following teams participated in the league regularly for at least a few years:
 Adana Demirspor
 Adana Torosspor
 Adana Türk Gücü
 Mersin İdman Yurdu
 Adana Seyhanspor
 Adana Millî Mensucat
 Adana İdman Yurdu
 Adana Türk Ocağı
 Silifke İdman Yurdu
 Tarsus İdman Yurdu

Champions

Performance by club

References

Sources
 

Defunct football leagues in Turkey
Sport in Adana
Sport in Mersin
Çukurova
1924 establishments in Turkey
Sports leagues established in 1924